The Voigtlander 90mm F3.5 APO-Lanthar SL II is an interchangeable camera lens announced by Voigtlander on February 17, 2010.

References
http://www.dpreview.com/products/voigtlander/lenses/voigtlander_90_3p5_slii/specifications

Camera lenses introduced in 2010